HMS Duke was a 90-gun second-rate ship of the line of the Royal Navy, launched on 13 June 1682 at Woolwich Dockyard.

She underwent a rebuild in 1701 as another 90-gun second rate, and was renamed HMS Prince George (after the future George II). After her rebuild, she served in the War of the Spanish Succession, fighting in the Battle of Málaga and the capture of Gibraltar.

On 4 November 1719 Prince George was ordered to be taken to pieces and rebuilt at Deptford by Richard Stacey, and she was relaunched on 4 September 1723 as a 90-gun second-rate built to the 1719 Establishment.

In June 1757 Prince George was taken into Portsmouth Dockyard for repairs. The work took four months to complete at a total cost of £9,513, after which the ship was recommissioned as the flagship of Rear Admiral Broderick. On 13 April 1758, Prince George was at sea in the Bay of Biscay when a fire broke out below decks. The flames quickly spread throughout the ship and she foundered with the loss of 485 out of 745 crew.

Notes

References
Lavery, Brian (2003) The Ship of the Line - Volume 1: The development of the battlefleet 1650-1850. Conway Maritime Press. .

External links
 

Ships of the line of the Royal Navy
1680s ships